The following outline is provided as an overview of and topical guide to Stockholm:

Stockholm –

General reference 
 Pronunciation: ,  or 
 Common English name(s): Stockholm
 Official English name(s): Stockholm
 Adjectival(s): Stockholmer
 Demonym(s): Stockholmer

Geography of Stockholm 
Geography of Stockholm
 Stockholm is:
 a city
 capital of Sweden
 Population of Stockholm: 949,761
 Area of Stockholm: 188 km2 (73 sq mi)

Location of Stockholm 

 Stockholm is situated within the following regions:
 Northern Hemisphere and Eastern Hemisphere
 Eurasia 
 Europe (outline)
 Northern Europe 
 Sweden (outline)
 Stockholm County
 Time zone(s): 
 Central European Time (UTC+01)
 In Summer (DST): Central European Summer Time (UTC+02)

Environment of Stockholm 

 Climate of Stockholm

Natural geographic features of Stockholm 

 Archipelagos in Stockholm
 Stockholm archipelago
 Bays in Stockholm
 Djurgårdsbrunnsviken
 Nybroviken
 Riddarfjärden
 Saltsjön
Stockholms ström
 Beaches in Stockholm
 Kanaanbadet
 Canals in Stockholm
 Djurgårdsbrunnskanalen
 Hammarby Sjö
 Klara Sjö
 Karlbergskanalen
 Islands in Stockholm
 Beckholmen
 Djurgården
 Helgeandsholmen 
 Kastellholmen
 Kungsholmen
 Lilla Essingen 
 Långholmen
 Reimersholme
 Riddarholmen
 Skeppsholmen
 Stadsholmen 
 Stora Essingen 
 Strömsborg
 Södermalm
 Lakes in Stockholm
 Brunnsviken
 Isbladskärret
 Mälaren
 Trekanten
 Rivers in Stockholm
 Kräppladiket
 Norrström
 Söderström
 Straits in Stockholm
 Lilla Värtan
 Vårbyfjärden

Areas of Stockholm 

 Stockholm City Centre 
 South Stockholm
 West Stockholm

Districts of Stockholm 

 Gamla stan
 Gärdet
 Norrmalm
 Östermalm
 Södermalm
 Vasastan

Neighbourhoods in Stockholm 

 Diplomatstaden
 Helgalunden
 Lärkstaden
 Slussenområdet

Locations in Stockholm 

 Tourist attractions in Stockholm
 Museums in Stockholm
 Shopping areas and markets

Bridges in Stockholm 

Bridges in Stockholm
 Bridge of Regeringsgatan
 Centralbron
 Djurgårdsbron
 Kungsbron
 Liljeholmsbron
 Norrbro
 Riksbron
 Sicklauddsbron
 Skeppsholmsbron
 Stallbron
 Strömbron
 Tranebergsbron
 Vasabron
 Västerbron

Cultural and exhibition centres in Stockholm 

 The House of Culture

Fountains in Stockholm 

 Fountains and ponds of Stockholm

Monuments and memorials in Stockholm 

 Aviator Monument
 Obelisk at Slottsbacken
 The Branting Monument

Museums and art galleries in Stockholm 

Museums in Stockholm
 Artipelag
 Dansmuseet
 Gummeson Gallery
 Hallwyl Museum
 Livrustkammaren
 Maritime Museum
 Millesgården
 Milliken Gallery
 Moderna Museet
 Museum of Ethnography
 Museum of Medieval Stockholm
 Nationalmuseum
 Nordic Museum
 Royal Coin Cabinet
 Stockholm City Museum
 Stockholm Music Museum
 Swedish Army Museum
 Swedish Centre for Architecture and Design
 Swedish History Museum
 Swedish Museum of Natural History
 Swedish National Museum of Science and Technology
 Thiel Gallery
 Vasa Museum
 Vasa (ship)
 Waldemarsudde

Palaces and villas in Stockholm 

 Arvfurstens palats
 Bonde Palace
 Lillienhoff Palace
 Makalös
 Rosendal Palace
 Rosersberg Palace
 Scheffler Palace
 Stockholm Palace
 Livrustkammaren
 Regalia of Sweden
 Royal Chapel
 Tessin Palace
 Van der Nootska Palace
 Villa Lusthusporten
 Wrangel Palace

Parks and gardens in Stockholm 

 Bellevue
 Bergianska trädgården
 Hagaparken
 Humlegården
 Kungsträdgården
 Lill-Jansskogen
 Observatorielunden
 Rålambshovsparken
 Rosendals Trädgård
 Royal National City Park
 Tantolunden
 Tegnérlunden
 Vanadislunden
 Vasaparken

Public squares in Stockholm 

 Gustav Adolfs torg
 Kornhamnstorg
 Medborgarplatsen
 Norrmalmstorg
 Sergels torg
 Stortorget
 Stureplan

Religious buildings in Stockholm 

Churches in Stockholm
 German Church
 Gustaf Vasa Church
 Riddarholm Church
 St. Eric's Cathedral
 St. John's Church
 Stockholm Mosque
 Storkyrkan

Secular buildings in Stockholm 

 Admiralty House
 Birger Jarls torn
 Bofills båge
 Central Post Office Building
 Ericsson Globe
 Gamla Riksarkivet
 Gasklockan
 Hötorget buildings
 House of Nobility
 Kastellet
 Konstnärshuset
 Kungsbrohuset
 Medborgarhuset
 Norstedt Building
 Old Parliament House
 Parliament House
 Rosenbad
 Royal Stables
 Sager House
 Södra Bankohuset
 Stockholm City Hall
 Blue Hall
 Golden Hall
 Stockholm Court House
 Stockholm Observatory
 Stockholm Public Library
 Stockholm Waterfront

Streets in Stockholm 

Streets and squares in Gamla stan
 Bankkajen
 Drottninggatan
 Götgatan
 Kungsgatan
 Riksgatan
 Skeppsbron
 Slottsbacken
 Strandvägen
 Sveavägen
 Vasagatan

Theatres in Stockholm 

 Oscarsteatern
 Royal Dramatic Theatre
 Södra Teatern
 Stockholm City Theatre

Towers in Stockholm 

 Kaknästornet

Demographics of Stockholm 

Demographics of Stockholm

Government and politics of Stockholm 

Government of Stockholm
 Stockholm Municipality
 Mayor of Stockholm
 
 International relations of Stockholm
 Twin towns and sister cities of Stockholm

Law and order in Stockholm 

 Law enforcement in Stockholm
 Stockholm Police Force

Military in Stockholm 

 Royal Guards

History of Stockholm 

History of Stockholm

History of Stockholm, by period or event 

Timeline of Stockholm history

 Prehistory and origin of Stockholm
 Stockholm during the Middle Ages (1250–1523)
 Stockholm Bloodbath (1520)
 Stockholm during the early Vasa era (1523–1611)
 Stockholm during the Swedish Empire (1611–1718) 
 Thirty Years' War (1618–1648)
 Stockholm during the Age of Liberty (1718–1772)
 Stockholm during the Gustavian era (1772–1809)
 Early industrial era (1809–1850)
 Late industrial era (1850–1910)
 Stockholm during the 20th century

History of Stockholm, by subject 

 Historical fires of Stockholm

Culture of Stockholm 

Culture of Stockholm

Arts in Stockholm

Architecture of Stockholm 
Architecture in Stockholm
 Buildings in Stockholm
 Tallest buildings in Stockholm

Cinema of Stockholm 

 Movie theaters in Stockholm
 Stockholm International Film Festival

Literature of Stockholm 

Literature in Stockholm

Music of Stockholm 

Music of Stockholm

 Music festivals and competitions in Stockholm
 Sound of Stockholm
 Stockholm Jazz Festival
 Music schools in Stockholm
 Royal College of Music 
 Royal Swedish Academy of Music
 Stockholm University College of Music Education
 University College of Opera
 Music venues in Stockholm
 Berwaldhallen
 Folkoperan
 Royal Swedish Opera
 Stockholm Concert Hall
 Musical ensembles in Stockholm
 Kungliga Hovkapellet
 Royal Stockholm Philharmonic Orchestra
 Stockholm Youth Symphony Orchestra
 Swedish Radio Choir
 Swedish Radio Symphony Orchestra
 Musicians from Stockholm
 Hugo Alfvén
 Franz Berwald
 Wilhelm Stenhammar
 Songs about Stockholm

Theatre of Stockholm 
Theatres in Stockholm
 Göta Lejon
 Maximteatern
 Orion Theatre
 Royal Dramatic Theatre
 Teater Galeasen

Visual arts of Stockholm 

Art in Stockholm
 Stockholm in art / Paintings of Stockholm 
 Public art in Stockholm
 Efter badet
 The Four Elements
Cuisine of Stockholm
 Söder tea
Events in Stockholm
 Nobel Banquet
 Stockholm Japan Expo
Festivals in Stockholm
 Stockholm Water Festival
Languages of Stockholm
 Swedish language
 Stockholm dialects
Media in Stockholm
 Newspapers in Stockholm
Expressen
Svenska Dagbladet
 Radio and television in Stockholm
 Sveriges Radio
 Sveriges Television
People from Stockholm
 Alfred Nobel

Religion in Stockholm 

Religion in Stockholm
 Catholicism in Stockholm
Roman Catholic Diocese of Stockholm
St. Eric's Cathedral
 Protestantism in Stockholm 
Church of Sweden
Diocese of Stockholm (Church of Sweden)
Gustaf Vasa Church
 Islam in Stockholm
 Stockholm Mosque

Sports in Stockholm 

Sport in Stockholm
 Basketball in Stockholm
 Solna Vikings
 Football in Stockholm
 Association football in Stockholm
 Stockholm derby
AIK Fotboll
Djurgårdens IF Fotboll
 Ice hockey in Stockholm
 Sweden men's national ice hockey team
 Sports competitions in Stockholm
 1912 Summer Olympics
 Stockholm Marathon
 Stockholm Open
 Sweden Hockey Games
 Sports venues in Stockholm
 Eriksdalsbadet
 Friends Arena
 Hovet
 Kungliga tennishallen
 Kungsängen Golf Club
 Solvalla
 Stockholm Olympic Stadium
 Tele2 Arena
Events at Tele2 Arena

Economy and infrastructure of Stockholm 

Economy of Stockholm

 Financial services in Stockholm
 Stockholm Stock Exchange
 Sveriges Riksbank
 Hotels and resorts in Stockholm
 Grand Hôtel
 Hotel Rival
 Infra City
 Rica Talk Hotel
 Scandic Hotel Ariadne
 Scandic Victoria Tower
 Restaurants and cafés in Stockholm
 Berns Salonger
 Cattelin
 Den gröne Jägaren
 Den Gyldene Freden
 Frantzén
 Oaxen Krog
 Operakällaren
Café Opera
 Shopping malls and markets in Stockholm
 Shopping malls in Stockholm
Kista Galleria
Mall of Scandinavia
 Tourism in Stockholm
 Tourist attractions in Stockholm

Transportation in Stockholm 

Public transport in Stockholm
 Air transport in Stockholm
 Airports in Stockholm 
 Stockholm Arlanda Airport
 Stockholm Bromma Airport
 Maritime transport in Stockholm
 Boat transport in Stockholm
Djurgården ferry 
 Road transport in Stockholm
 Buses in Stockholm
Flygbussarna
 Car sharing in Stockholm
 DriveNow 
 Cycling in Stockholm
 Stockholm City Bikes
 Roads in Stockholm
Förbifart Stockholm
Stockholm Ring Road

Rail transport in Stockholm 

Rail transport in Stockholm
 Arlanda Express
 Skansens bergbana
  Stockholm commuter rail
Stockholm City Line
 Railway stations in Stockholm
 Stockholm Central Station
 Stockholm City Station
 Stockholm East Station
 Stockholm North Station
 Stockholm South Station
  Stockholm metro
 Lines
:  Kungsträdgården — Hjulsta
:  Kungsträdgården — Akalla
: Norsborg — Ropsten
: Fruängen — Mörby centrum
: Åkeshov — Skarpnäck
: Alvik — Farsta strand
: Hässelby Strand — Hagsätra
Stations
 Trams in Stockholm
 Djurgårdslinjen
 Lidingöbanan
 Nockebybanan
 Spårväg City
 Tvärbanan

Education in Stockholm 

Education in Stockholm
 Universities and colleges in Stockholm
 Karolinska Institute
 Royal Institute of Technology
 Stockholm University
 Stockholm University of the Arts
 Research institutes in Stockholm
 Stockholm Environment Institute

Healthcare in Stockholm 

Healthcare in Stockholm
 Hospitals in Stockholm
 Karolinska University Hospital
 Serafimerlasarettet
 Sophiahemmet
 Södersjukhuset

See also 

 Outline of geography

References

External links 

Stockholm
Stockholm